Joseph Margulies may refer to:
 Joseph Margulies (artist) (1896–1984), Vienna-born American painter and printmaker
 Joseph Margulies (lawyer), American attorney